Mob programming (sometimes informally called mobbing or ensemble programming) is a software development approach where the whole team works on the same thing, at the same time, in the same space, and at the same computer. This is similar to pair programming where two people sit at the same computer and collaborate on the same code at the same time. With mob programming, the collaboration is extended to everyone on the team, while still using a single computer for writing the code and inputting it into the code base.

 

It builds on principles of lean manufacturing, extreme programming, and lean software development. Early use of the phrase "mob programming" was made in Extreme Programming Perspectives.

In addition to software coding, a mob programming team can work together to tackle other typical software development tasks. Some examples include:  defining user stories or requirements, designing, testing, deploying software, and working with subject matter experts. Almost all work is handled in working meetings or workshops, where all the people involved in creating the software are considered to be team members, including the customer and business experts. Mob programming also works for distributed teams in the same virtual space using screen sharing technology.

See also 
 Pair programming
 Extreme programming
 Team programming

References

External links
 Official site

Extreme programming